Randeng may refer to:

 Randeng Daoren, Chinese Taoist deity
 Dipankara, Buddha, origin of Randeng Daoren